The Southwestern Entomologist is a quarterly peer-reviewed scientific journal published by the Society of Southwestern Entomologists. It was established since 1976 and is a regional publication covering entomological research conducted primarily in Texas, Oklahoma, New Mexico, and Mexico. It is published in English, with optional abstracts in Spanish.

References

External links 
 

Entomology journals and magazines
Quarterly journals
English-language journals
Publications established in 1976
Academic journals published by learned and professional societies of the United States
1976 establishments in the United States